High Fidelity Pure Audio, occasionally abbreviated as HFPA, is a marketing initiative, spearheaded by Sony Music Universal Music Group, for audio-only Blu-ray optical discs.  Launched in 2013 as a potential successor to the compact disc (CD), it has been compared with DVD-Audio and SACD, which had similar aims.

HFPA is encoded as 24-bit/96 kHz or 24-bit/192 kHz linear PCM ("high-resolution audio"), optionally losslessly compressed with Dolby TrueHD or DTS-HD Master Audio.

HFPA discs are compatible with existing Blu-Ray players.

Pure Audio Blu-ray refers to a different initiative (but with some goals in common) launched by msm-studios in Germany in 2009.

As of November 2019, Deutsche Grammophon is the most prolific publisher on the format, with Beethoven 250 having three Blu-Ray audio discs.

References

External links
 
 

Audio storage
Blu-ray Disc

Audiovisual introductions in 2013